Sándor Rónai (6 October 189228 September 1965) was a Hungarian communist political figure. He served as Chairman of the Hungarian Presidential Council between 1950 and 1952 and as
Speaker of the National Assembly of Hungary from 1952 to 1963.

References

1892 births
1965 deaths
People from Miskolc
People from the Kingdom of Hungary
Social Democratic Party of Hungary politicians
Members of the Hungarian Working People's Party
Members of the Hungarian Socialist Workers' Party
Presidents of Hungary
Speakers of the National Assembly of Hungary
Members of the National Assembly of Hungary (1945–1947)
Members of the National Assembly of Hungary (1947–1949)
Members of the National Assembly of Hungary (1949–1953)
Members of the National Assembly of Hungary (1953–1958)
Members of the National Assembly of Hungary (1958–1963)
Members of the National Assembly of Hungary (1963–1967)